Semjong is a village development committee in Dhading District in the Bagmati Zone of central Nepal. At the time of the 1991 Nepal census it had a population of 4068. Caste (Gurung, Dalits, Tamang and others).

References

Populated places in Dhading District